One Out of Two is a 2006 Italian drama film directed by Eugenio Cappuccio. It entered the competition at the Rome Film Festival, in which Ninetto Davoli was awarded best supporting actor.

Cast 

 Fabio Volo: Lorenzo
 Anita Caprioli: Silvia
 Giuseppe Battiston: Paolo
 Paola Rota: Antonia
 Ninetto Davoli: Giovanni
 Tresy Taddei: Tresy
 Agostina Belli: Elena

References

External links

2006 films
Italian drama films
2006 drama films
2000s Italian films
2000s Italian-language films